Eunos Bus Interchange is a bus interchange located in Geylang East, Singapore. It is located and built beside Eunos MRT station and is surrounded by Eunos Road 2, Eunos Crescent and Sims Avenue.

The interchange is designed with traditional Malay roof structure and shape, but using modern materials such as steel beams, similar to that of the Eunos MRT station. It gives a sense of identity to the area as the bus interchange lies close to Geylang and also to honour Eunos Abdullah whom secured 700-hectares of land for the Malay settlements in the early 1900s.

This bus interchange is the one of the few bus interchanges not located in the respective town centre.

History
The interchange was first announced in October 1984, as one of eight planned bus interchanges that were connected to the Mass Rapid Transit network.
The interchange opened on 10 December 1989, along with Pasir Ris Bus Interchange. Sporting a Minangkabau-style roof, the interchange had 30 parking bays, and six berths.

Bus Contracting Model

Under the new bus contracting model, all the bus routes buses were split into 4 route packages: 

 61 under Choa Chu Kang-Bukit Panjang
 76 under Seletar
 93 under Bukit Merah
 The rest are under Serangoon-Eunos

References

External links
 
 

Bus stations in Singapore
Geylang